Dariela los martes is a 2015 Mexican drama film directed by Mauricio T. Valle. The film starred by Paola Núñez and Mauricio T. Valle in lead roles. It premiered on December 4, 2014.

Plot 
An actress named Dariela (Paola Núñez), in the midst of a personal crisis, meets Rodrigo (Mauricio T. Valle), who is in the middle of a divorce. They begin to work together on a project to order; Attraction and understanding are given immediately. The love story that both need and invent for their script, becomes reality. The appointment every Tuesday becomes indispensable in their lives.

Cast 
 Paola Núñez as Dariela
 Mauricio T. Valle as Rodrigo
 Luis Ernesto Franco
 Rafael Simón

References

External links